Morko y Mali is an Argentine children's television series, produced by Metrovision Producciones S.A. was broadcast by Disney Junior Latin America on July 16, 2016 and ended on December 15, 2017. On November 17, 2020, the series is available on Disney+.

Plot
Morko and his sister Mali help the animals that inhabit the jungle around them. Meanwhile, they learn about mathematics and how to preserve the natural environment.

Cast & characters
 Tomás Ottaviano as Morko
 Agustina Vera as Mali
 Dalana Traversa Farias as Únana
 Daniel Moschini as Dosdo
 Florencia Diacono as Tresia
 Leandro Casas Silva as Cuatricio

Puppet performers
 Alma Delia Pérez as Guga
 Gerardo Becker as Tulu and the Luminoso #1
 Eduardo Partida as Kamo
 Sergio Zaldívar as Sopa
 Octavio Rojas as Tuti
 Raymundo Armijo as Toto and the Luminoso #3
 Gerardo Velázquez as Tito, Luminín and the Luminoso #2
 Erika Ugalde as Gala
 Sonia Casillas as Niki
 Ulises Maynardo as Silas

List of episodes

Season 1 (2016)
 La Carrera De Las Caracolas (Parte 1)
 La Carrera De Las Caracolas (Parte 2)
 Un Desfile Luminoso
 Un Collar de Plumas
 El Gran Plan
 El Día de los Amigos de La Selva
 El Secreto de los Instrumentos Perdidos
 ¿Quién quiere ser Invisible?
 Los Tres Monosqueteros 
 Achís, Dijo Guga
 Una Serenata para Gala
 La Guga colgante
 El Baile de los Plátanos 
 Un Atrapasueños para Unana
 ¿Cómo Desbaratar un Trabalenguas?
 Niki y Gala tienen visitas 
 Un Retrato para Morko
 Una Sopa para Sopa
 El Fantasma
 Atrapado de las Alturas 
 El Tresimbao de Tresia
 El Jardín de Bailarín  
 El Desfile de los Selvidisfraces
 ¿Queremos Saber?
 Los Carteles Perdidos 
 El Ritmo de la Selva

Season 2 (2017)
 El Morko Equivocado 
 El Coco más rico de la Selva
 Malinieves y los tres monanos
 La Competencia de trompos 
 Perfume a pie 
 Los Zapatos bailarines 
 Un té relajante por favor
 Marcianos en la selva
 Un día de pícnic 
 Operativo burbojoso
 La balsa rota 
 El monomóvil de Tito
 Con los pelos de punta
 ¿Para quién es el regalo?
 Una Sorpresa para Santa
 En busca de la priprioca
 El más fuerte de la Selva 
 Encerrados en la cueva
 Misión Rescate
 No soy yo 
 Pasarán Pasarán 
 El Tótem se atascó
 Quisiera ser como tú
 Un tesoro para Tulú
 Resfriarse es un mal plan 
 La Fruta de lo contrario

Soundtrack

The soundtrack was released by the Walt Disney Records, on CD and digital streaming on October 21, 2016 contains 12 songs.

Track listing

References

External links

2016 Argentine television series debuts
2017 Argentine television series endings
Argentine children's television series
Musical television series
Television series about children
Television series by Disney
Disney Junior original programming
2010s preschool education television series